Shek Kwu Lung is a village in the Siu Lek Yuen area of Sha Tin District, Hong Kong.

Administration
Shek Kwu Lung is a recognized village under the New Territories Small House Policy. It is one of the villages represented within the Sha Tin Rural Committee. For electoral purposes, Shek Kwu Lung is part of the Kwong Hong constituency, which was formerly represented by Ricardo Liao Pak-hong until July 2021.

History
At the time of the 1911 census, the population of Shek Kwu Lung was 55. The number of males was 18.

See also
 Kau Yeuk (Sha Tin)

References

Further reading

External links
 Delineation of area of existing village Shek Kwu Lung and Nam Shan (Sha Tin) for election of resident representative (2019 to 2022)

Villages in Sha Tin District, Hong Kong
Siu Lek Yuen